Andrew Stein (born Andrew J. Finkelstein; March 4, 1945) is an American Democratic politician who served on the New York City Council and was its last president, and as Manhattan Borough President.

Early life
Stein's father, Jerry Finkelstein, was the multi-millionaire publisher of the New York Law Journal, among other publications. Stein shortened his name when he entered politics. Stein attended Southampton College. He is Jewish.

Career 
He was a member of the New York State Assembly from 1969 to 1977, sitting in the 178th, 179th, 180th, 181st and 182nd New York State Legislatures. He was well known for his series of public hearings into the management practices of nursing homes in the state.

In 1977, Stein was elected as borough president of Manhattan, defeating Robert F. Wagner Jr. and New York City Clerk David Dinkins in the Democratic primary. Stein defeated Dinkins again in the 1981 Democratic primary for the borough presidency. He was the Democratic nominee for Congress in the "Silk Stocking District" on Manhattan's East Side in 1984, but was defeated by incumbent Republican S. William Green. Stein declined a race for a third term as borough president in 1985 to run for city council president.

As city council president, Stein served as the presiding officer of the city council, was acting mayor in the absence or disability of Mayor Edward I. Koch, was a voting member of the New York City Board of Estimate, and handled constituent and policy issues. Stein derived most of his power from his seat on the Board of Estimate, which was made up of the mayor, the city comptroller and the city council president, each of whom had two votes, and the five borough presidents, each with one vote. Stein was re-elected City Council President in 1989.

In 1989, a decision by the United States Supreme Court declared the Board of Estimate was unconstitutional, in that it violated the principle of "one man, one vote", and a rewriting of the city charter called for the city council presidency to be abolished and the office of Public Advocate to be created as the presiding officer of the council and first in line of succession to the mayor. The change in duties would occur when Stein's term expired on January 1, 1994.

In 1993, Stein announced he would challenge Mayor Dinkins in the primary. Despite his reputation as a liberal, Stein had tried to get the endorsement of the Republican and Conservative parties, but was unsuccessful. Stein later dropped out before the primary and briefly tried a bid for public advocate against City Consumer Affairs Commissioner Mark J. Green, City Councilwoman Susan Alter, and State Sen. David Paterson, but withdrew from the race after a few weeks.

Stein retired from the city council presidency and from public life in the city. Since leaving office, he has pursued private business as a partner in Arapaho Partners, LLC, a business consulting firm based in New York City.

On May 27, 2010, Stein was indicted and arrested for lying about his involvement during the investigation of the multimillion-dollar Ponzi scheme involving Ken Starr, a financial advisor to various Hollywood celebrities. He pleaded guilty to a misdemeanor tax evasion charge and was sentenced to 500 hours of community service.

Personal life
Stein has been married twice. He and his first wife have one daughter. Stein's second marriage to attorney, Lynn Forester, lasted from 1983 to 1993 with the couple having two sons.

According to a report in the New York Post on October 10, 2007, Stein had begun dating the conservative writer Ann Coulter. When asked about the relationship, Stein told the paper, "She's attacked a lot of my friends, but what can I say, opposites attract!" On January 7, 2008, Stein told the Post that the relationship was over, citing irreconcilable differences.

Bibliography
Paterson, David Black, Blind, & In Charge: A Story of Visionary Leadership and Overcoming Adversity. New York, New York, 2020

References

1945 births
21st-century American Jews
Jewish American state legislators in New York (state)
Living people
Manhattan borough presidents
Democratic Party members of the New York State Assembly
New York (state) politicians convicted of crimes
Place of birth missing (living people)
New York (state) politicians convicted of corruption
Southampton College alumni